Världens bästa servitris is a 1991 studio album from Swedish dansband Lotta & Anders Engbergs Orkester.

Track listing

Side A

Side B

References 

1991 albums
Lotta & Anders Engbergs orkester albums